Lauri Jaakoppi Härö (8 June 1899 – 30 March 1980) was a Finnish sprinter. He competed in the 100 m, 200 m and 4 × 100 m events at the 1924 Summer Olympics, but failed to reach the finals.

References

External links
 

1899 births
1980 deaths
Athletes (track and field) at the 1924 Summer Olympics
Finnish male sprinters
Olympic athletes of Finland
People from Mäntyharju
Sportspeople from South Savo